Scottish national team may refer to:

Scotland national Australian rules football team
Scotland national badminton team
Scotland national basketball team
Scotland women's national basketball team
Scotland national cricket team
Scotland national under-19 cricket team
Scotland national football team
Scotland national cerebral palsy football team
Scotland national B football team
Scotland national under-16 football team
Scotland national under-17 football team
Scotland national under-19 football team
Scotland national under-20 football team
Scotland national under-21 football team
Scotland national under-23 football team
Scotland national semi-professional football team
Scotland national ice hockey team
Scotland women's national ice hockey team
Scotland national indoor lacrosse team
Scotland women's national lacrosse team
Scotland national korfball team
Scotland national kabaddi team
Scotland national netball team
Scotland national roller derby team
Scotland national rugby league team
Scotland A national rugby league team
Scotland national rugby union team
Scotland national under-16 rugby union team
Scotland national under-17 rugby union team
Scotland national under-18 rugby union team
Scotland national under-19 rugby union team
Scotland national under-20 rugby union team
Scotland national under-21 rugby union team
Scotland A national rugby union team
Scotland national women's rugby union team
Scotland national rugby sevens team
Scotland women's national rugby sevens team
Scotland A national rugby union team
Scotland national shinty team
Scotland men's national field hockey team
Scotland men's national squash team
Scotland women's national cricket team
Scotland women's national field hockey team
Scotland women's national football team
Scotland women's national under-17 football team
Scotland women's national under-23 football team
Scotland women's national squash team